Zhang Huizan (1884 or 1885 – 28 January 1931) was a Lieutenant general in the Chinese National Revolutionary Army.

Biography
Born in 1884 or 1885 in Changsha County, Hunan, during the Qing Empire, where he attended Hunan Bingmu School and Hunan Army Jiangwu School. After graduating from Baoding Military Academy he went to the Empire of Japan to study at Imperial Japanese Army Academy. He returned to the nascent Republic of China in 1912 and that year became staff officer in Hunan Military Government, but soon he went to the German Empire to make investigations of military.

In 1920, he became brigade commander of the 4th Mixed Brigade of the Hunan Army, he took part in the expulsion of Zhang Jingyao movement with Mao Zedong, who will be the future leader of Communist Party. He was promoted to commanding officer of the 9th Division in 1924. In 1926, the Nationalist government commissioned him as the commanding officer of the 4th Division of the 2nd National Revolutionary Army, he led the troops to the Northern Expedition. In 1929, he was commanding officer of the 18th Division, and that same year, he was promoted to Lieutenant general, but soon was transferred to Jiangxi to defend the Red Army.

In late 1930, he was commissioned as commanding officer of the 18th Division,  fought with the Red Army in the first "Encirclement" Campaign. On December 30, he lost the battle against the Red Army and was captured. On January 28, 1931, he was decapitated by the angry crowds. His head was thrown into the Gan River, the National Revolutionary Army salvaged his head and buried him at Yuelu Mountain, in northwestern Changsha. In reprisal, the National government killed more than one hundred Communist political prisoners in Nanchang, capital of Jiangxi province.

During the Cultural Revolution, his grave was smashed by the Red Guards. In May 2008, it was repaired by the Changsha Municipal People's Government.

Personal life
Zhang and his wife Zhu Xinfang had one son and one daughter:

 Son: Zhang Yuanmou (1918 - 1996), was a professor at Tianjin University, he was a member of the China Democratic League.
 Daughter: Zhang Yuanyi, is a Chinese-American architect.

References

1880s births
1931 deaths
Baoding Military Academy alumni
Imperial Japanese Army Academy alumni
People from Changsha County
People executed by China by decapitation
National Revolutionary Army generals from Hunan
Chinese police officers